Sefaattin Tongay is an American materials scientist and engineer internationally recognized for materials synthesis and discovery for next-generation quantum technologies. He is the chair of undergraduate Materials Science and Engineering at Arizona State University and serves as an associate editor at American Institute of Physics (AIP) Applied Physics Reviews and  Nature 2D materials & applications by Nature.

Recognition 
His work received a number of prestigious awards including one from the president of United States Donald Trump Presidential Early Career Award for Scientists and Engineers given to outstanding scientists and engineers in the U.S. by the White House. His work has resulted in prestigious National Science Foundation CAREER Award and Ten Outstanding Young Persons of the World award. In 2019 and 2020, his work has seen him identified as one of the most influential researchers over the past decade by Clarivate Analytics and Web of Science. Google scholar statistics independently has identified him as one of the top 10 researchers in the world in the area of quantum materials and top 50 in two-dimensional materials.

Research and career 
He studied materials physics at the University of Florida working with Prof. Dr. Arthur F. Hebard and postdoctoral fellowship at the materials science and engineering at the University of California, Berkeley and Stanford. He is known for his patent integrating conductive graphene into flexible displays, solar cells, and touch screens. His notable and most cited work includes manufacturing of 2D and quantum materials, 2D Janus materials, the discovery of 2D anisotropic materials including Rhenium disulfide (ReS₂), graphene based high-power devices, and graphene solar cells. His research often uses alloying, defects engineering, dopants, and manufacturing techniques to create a new set of functionalities. His other seminal contributions include establishing the genome of defects in 2D quantum materials, 2D alloying, van der Waals epitaxy, the discovery of Moire excitons in 2Ds, and band alignment theory of 2D superlattices.

Awards and honors 
 2021 Lamonte H. Lawrence Professor Fellow in Solid State Science
 2021  Highly Cited Researchers of the World (Web of Science and Clarivate Analytics)
 2021 Sigma Xi Full member
 2020 Highly Cited Researchers of the World (Web of Science and Clarivate Analytics)
2019 Presidential Early Career Award for Scientists and Engineers (PECASE) awards
 2019 Ten Outstanding Young Persons of the World – Academic Leadership and Accomplishment – Turkey
 2019 Highly Cited Researchers of 2019 by Web of Science and Clarivate Analytics
2019 Top Teaching Award by Arizona State University 
 2019 Chair of Materials Science and Engineering Arizona State University 
2019 World Nobel Laureates Association -Young Scientists Award 
2019 Associate Editor at Applied Physics Reviews 
2018 Top Teaching Award by Arizona State University 
2017 Top Reviewer award by Chemistry of Materials American Chemical Society
2017 Top Teaching Award by Arizona State University
 2016 National Science Foundation CAREER Awards
2016 Top Teaching Award by Arizona State University 
 2016 Top Engineering Faculty Teaching Award by Arizona State University
 2016 The Scientist of the Year Award by Turkish Science Heroes Association
2015 Top Teaching Award by Arizona State University
2010 Tom Scott Memorial Award by the University of Florida

References 

American people of Turkish descent
Bilkent University alumni
University of Florida alumni
Turkish physicists
Turkish materials scientists
Arizona State University faculty
German people of Turkish descent
1980 births
Living people